Sathamangalam Ranga Iyengar Srinivasa Varadhan FRS (born 2 January 1940) is an Indian American mathematician, widely recognised as one of the most influential mathematicians of the 20th century. He is known for his fundamental contributions to probability theory and in particular for creating a unified theory of large deviations. He is regarded and revered as one of the fundamental contributors to the theory of diffusion processes with an orientation towards the refinement and further development of Itô’s stochastic calculus. In the year 2007, he became the first Asian to win the Abel Prize.

Early life and education 
Srinivasa was born into a Hindu Tamil Brahmin Iyengar family in 1940  in Chennai (then Madras). In 1953, his family migrated to Kolkata. He grew up in Chennai and Kolkata. Varadhan received his undergraduate degree in 1959 and his postgraduate degree in 1960 from Presidency College, Chennai.  He received his doctorate from ISI in 1963 under C R Rao, who arranged for Andrey Kolmogorov to be present at Varadhan's thesis defence. He was one of the "famous four" (the others being R Ranga Rao, K R Parthasarathy, and Veeravalli S Varadarajan) in ISI during 1956–1963.

Career
Since 1963, he has worked at the Courant Institute of Mathematical Sciences at New York University, where he was at first a postdoctoral fellow (1963–66), strongly recommended by Monroe D Donsker. Here he met Daniel Stroock, who became a close colleague and co-author. In an article in the Notices of the American Mathematical Society, Stroock recalls these early years:

Varadhan is currently a professor at the Courant Institute. He is known for his work with Daniel W Stroock on diffusion processes, and for his work on large deviations with Monroe D Donsker. He has chaired the Mathematical Sciences jury for the Infosys Prize from 2009 and was the chief guest in 2020.

Awards and honours
Varadhan's awards and honours include the National Medal of Science (2010) from President Barack Obama, "the highest honour bestowed by the United States government on scientists, engineers and inventors". He also received the Birkhoff Prize (1994), the Margaret and Herman Sokol Award of the Faculty of Arts and Sciences, New York University (1995), and the Leroy P Steele Prize for Seminal Contribution to Research (1996) from the American Mathematical Society, awarded for his work with Daniel W Stroock on diffusion processes. He was awarded the Abel Prize in 2007 for his work on large deviations with Monroe D Donsker. In 2008, the Government of India awarded him the Padma Bhushan. and in 2023, he was awarded India's second highest civilian honor Padma Vibhushan. He also has two honorary degrees from Université Pierre et Marie Curie in Paris (2003) and from Indian Statistical Institute in Kolkata, India (2004).

Varadhan is a member of the US National Academy of Sciences (1995), and the Norwegian Academy of Science and Letters (2009). He was elected to Fellow of the American Academy of Arts and Sciences (1988), the Third World Academy of Sciences (1988), the Institute of Mathematical Statistics (1991), the Royal Society (1998), the Indian Academy of Sciences (2004), the Society for Industrial and Applied Mathematics (2009), and the American Mathematical Society (2012).

Selected publications
Convolution Properties of Distributions on Topological Groups. Dissertation, Indian Statistical Institute, 1963.

 (with M D Donsker) 
 (with M D Donsker) Asymptotic evaluation of certain Markov process expectations for large time. I, Communications on Pure and Applied Mathematics 28 (1975), pp. 1–47; part II, 28 (1975), pp. 279–301; part III, 29 (1976), pp 389–461; part IV, 36 (1983), pp 183–212.

See also
Varadhan's lemma

References

External links

 S. R. Srinivasa Varadhan, home page at the Courant Institute
 
 

Abel Prize laureates
Members of the United States National Academy of Sciences
Fellows of the American Academy of Arts and Sciences
Fellows of the American Mathematical Society
Fellows of the Royal Society
Foreign Fellows of the Indian National Science Academy
Indian emigrants to the United States
American mathematicians
20th-century Indian mathematicians
21st-century Indian mathematicians
Indian statisticians
Courant Institute of Mathematical Sciences faculty
Presidency College, Chennai alumni
University of Madras alumni
Living people
Probability theorists
1940 births
American people of Indian Tamil descent
Recipients of the Padma Bhushan in literature & education
Fellows of the Society for Industrial and Applied Mathematics
Institute for Advanced Study visiting scholars
Members of the Norwegian Academy of Science and Letters
National Medal of Science laureates
Presidents of the Institute of Mathematical Statistics
Indian Statistical Institute alumni
American academics of Indian descent
Scientists from Chennai
Annals of Probability editors
Mathematical statisticians
Recipients of the Padma Vibhushan in science & engineering